Adult Entertainment is Raffi's third LP album for his Troubadour label, released in 1977. This is the second of two records Raffi made with adult listeners in mind (the first being 1975's Good Luck Boy). Apart from several self-penned songs, Raffi also covers songs from Jesse Winchester ("Yankee Lady") and fellow Canadian folk artist Stan Rogers ("Forty-Five Years"). This album was later released as "Lovelight" (1980).  It is currently not available in CD format.

Track listing

Personnel
Adapted from LP liner notes.
 Raffi – vocals, acoustic guitar, jacket design
 Don Potter – electric guitar, kalimba, vocals, acoustic guitar (4, 8), producer
 Ed Roth – piano, electric piano, synthesizer, accordion, vocals
 Bob Doidge – bass
 Bill Cymbala – drums, percussion
 Ben Mink – violin, mandolin
 Chris Whiteley – harmonica
 Garnet Rogers – vocals (1, 3)
 Jude Johnson – vocals (1, 3)
 Carla Jensen – vocals (5-7)
 Judy Donnelly – vocals (5-7)
 Bob Lanois – recording engineer
 Linda Leitch – photography
 Doug Powers – jacket design
 Marla Freedman – jacket design

References

1977 albums
Raffi (musician) albums